Diomedes may refer to:

Fiction and mythology
Diomedes, a hero of the Trojan War and king of Argos in Greek mythology
Diomedes of Thrace, king of Thrace in Greek mythology
Mares of Diomedes, legendary man-eating horses
 Captain Diomedes, a character in the video games Warhammer 40,000: Dawn of War II – Chaos Rising and Warhammer 40,000: Dawn of War II – Retribution

Geography
Villa of Diomedes, Pompeii, Italy
Diomede Islands, Russian and U.S. islands in the Bering Strait
Diomede Bay, Vladivostok, Russia
1437 Diomedes, an asteroid

Historical figures
Diomedes Soter (first century BC), an Indo-Greek king
Saint Diomedes of Tarsus (died c.300), feast day August 16
Saint Diomedes, feast day September 2
Diomedes Grammaticus (4th century), a Latin grammarian
Diomedes Cato (c.1563–c.1618), a Polish-Italian composer
Diomedes Maturan (c.1940-2002), a Filipino actor
Diomedes Komnenos (1956-1973), a Greek student and casualty of the Athens Polytechnic uprising
Diomedes Díaz (1957–2013), a Colombian vallenato singer and composer

See also
Diomed, a famous racehorse
HMS Diomede,  Royal Navy ships